CSSF may refer to:

Organizations 
 Center for the Study of Science Fiction
 Commission de Surveillance du Secteur Financier
 Conflict, Stability and Security Fund
 The Felician Sisters (officially known as the Congregation Of Sisters Of St. Felix Of Cantalice Third Order Regular Of St. Francis Of Assisi (CSSF))